Victor Lemonte Wooten (born September 11, 1964) is an American bassist, songwriter, and record producer. He has been the bassist for Béla Fleck and the Flecktones since the group's formation in 1988 and a member of the band SMV with two other bassists, Stanley Clarke and Marcus Miller. From 2017 to 2019 he recorded as the bassist for the metal band Nitro.

He owns Vix Records, which releases his albums. He wrote the novel The Music Lesson: A Spiritual Search for Growth Through Music. He later released the book's sequel, The Spirit of Music: The Lesson Continues, on February 2, 2021.

Wooten is the recipient of five Grammy Awards. He won the Bass Player of the Year award from Bass Player magazine three times and is the first person to win the award more than once. In 2011, he was ranked No. 10 in the Top 10 Bassists of All Time by Rolling Stone magazine.

In 2018–2019 Wooten was diagnosed with a rare neurological condition called focal dystonia in his hands and upper body, which had been limiting his ability to play in previous years, but has since abated somewhat.

Early life and career

Born to Dorothy and Elijah Wooten, Victor is the youngest of the five Wooten brothers; Regi, Roy, Rudy, and Joseph Wooten are all musicians. Regi began to teach Victor to play bass when he was two, and by the age of six, he was performing with his brothers in their family band, The Wooten Brothers Band. As a United States Air Force family, they moved often when Wooten was young. The family settled in Newport News, Virginia, in 1972. Wooten graduated from Denbigh High School in 1982. While in high school, he and his brothers played in the country music venue at Busch Gardens theme park in Williamsburg, Virginia. In 1987, he traveled to Nashville, Tennessee, to visit friends that he made at the theme park. One of them was a studio engineer who introduced him to Béla Fleck, with whom he has often collaborated.

In 2000, Wooten created a music program called Bass/Nature camp that was expanded into Victor Wooten's Center for Music and Nature and includes all instruments. His camps are at Wooten Woods, a 147-acre retreat in Only, Tennessee, near Nashville. Wooten co-leads the "Victor Wooten/Berklee Summer Bass Workshop" at Berklee College of Music in Boston. At Berklee and his own camps, he collaborates with Berklee Bass Department chair, Steve Bailey. The two bassists have been teaching together since the early 1990s.

He was featured on the May/June 2014 cover of Making Music Magazine to discuss the camps.

Instruments

Wooten is most often seen playing Fodera basses, of which he has a signature model. His most famous Fodera, a 1983 Monarch Deluxe he refers to as "number 1," sports a Kahler Tremolo System model 2400 bridge. Fodera's "Yin Yang" basses (co-designed by and created for Wooten) incorporates the Yin Yang symbol—which Wooten uses in various media—as a focal point of the top's design and construction. The symbol is created from two pieces of naturally finished wood (Ebony and Holly, for example), fitted together to create the Yin-Yang pattern.

As well as playing electric bass (both fretted and fretless) and the double bass, he played cello in high school. He still plays cello occasionally with the Flecktones as well as in the 2012 Sword and Stone/Words and Tones tour.

Discography

Solo Albums
 A Show of Hands (Compass, 1996)
 What Did He Say? (Compass, 1997)
 Yin-Yang (Compass, 1999)
 Live in America (Compass, 2001)
 Soul Circus (Vanguard, 2005)
 Palmystery (Heads Up, 2008)
 The Music Lesson (Vix, 2011)
 Words & Tones (Vix, 2012)
 Sword & Stone (Vix, 2012)
 Trypnotyx (Vix, 2017)

As the Wootens 
 The Wootens with The Wootens (Arista, 1985)

As Bass Extremes – with Steve Bailey  
 Cookbook (Tone Center, 1998)
 Just Add Water (Tone Center, 2001)
 S'Low Down (Vix, 2022)

As Vital Tech Tones – with Scott Henderson and Steve Smith  
 Vital Tech Tones (Tone Center, 1998)
 VTT2 (Tone Center, 2000)

As SMV – with Stanley Clarke and Marcus Miller  
 Thunder, as SMV (Heads Up, 2008)

With Béla Fleck and the Flecktones
 Béla Fleck and the Flecktones (Warner Bros., 1990)
 Flight of the Cosmic Hippo (Warner Bros., 1991)
 UFO Tofu (Warner Bros., 1992)
 Three Flew Over the Cuckoo's Nest (Warner Bros., 1993)
 Tales from the Acoustic Planet (Warner Bros., 1995)
 Live Art  (Warner Bros., 1996)
 Left of Cool (Warner Bros., 1998)
 Greatest Hits of the 20th Century (Warner Bros., 1999)
 Outbound  (Columbia, 2000)
 Live at the Quick  (Columbia, 2002)
 Little Worlds (Columbia, 2003)
 Ten From Little Worlds (Columbia, 2003)
 The Hidden Land (Columbia, 2006)
 Jingle All the Way  (Rounder, 2008)
 Rocket Science (eOne, 2011)

With others
 Darol Anger, Heritage (Six Degrees, 1997)
 Steve Bailey, Evolution (Victor, 1994)
 Eric Bibb, Jericho Road (DixieFrog, 2013)
 Paul Brady, Spirits Colliding (Fontana 1995)
 Alex Bugnon, 107 degrees in the Shade (Orpheus/Epic, 1991)
 Jeff Coffin, Mutopia (Compass, 2008)
 Jeff Coffin, The Inside of the Outside (Ear Up, 2015)
 Bootsy Collins, Tha Funk Capital of the World (Mascot, 2011)
 Bootsy Collins, World Wide Funk (Mascot, 2017)
 Larry Coryell, Cause and Effect (Tone Center, 1998)
 John Cowan, Sixty (Compass, 2014)
 The Duhks, The Duhks (Sugar Hill, 2005)
 Stuart Duncan, Stuart Duncan (Rounder, 1992)
 Tommy Emmanuel, Little by Little (Favored Nations, 2010)
 Bill Evans, Soulgrass (BHM, 2005)
 Bill Evans, The Other Side of Something (Intuition, 2007)
 Gov't Mule, The Deepest End (Evangeline, 2003)
 David Grier, Lone Soldier (Rounder, 1995)
 David Grier, Evocative (Dreadnought, 2009)
 Greg Howe and Dennis Chambers, Extraction (Tone Center, 2003)
 India Arie, Testimony: Vol. 1, Life & Relationship (Motown, 2006)
 Keb Mo, The Reflection (Yolabelle, 2011)
 Buckshot LeFonque, Buckshot LeFonque (Columbia, 1994)
 Natalie MacMaster, Blueprint (Rounder, 2003)
 Dave Matthews Band, Live in Chicago at the United Center 12.19.98 (RCA, 2001)
 Jaco Pastorius, Word of Mouth Revisited (Heads Up, 2003)
 Mark O'Connor, The New Nashville Cats (Warner Bros., 1991)
 Charlie Peacock, Love Press Ex-Curio (Runway Network, 2005)
 Jonathan Scales, Jonathan Scales Fourchestra (Ropeadope, 2013)
 Shane Theriot, Highway 90 (Shose, 2000)
 Steve Weingart, Dialogue (Skeewa Music, 2011)
 Matt White, Worlds Wide (Ear Up, 2017)
 Keller Williams, Dream (SCI Fidelity, 2007)
 Cory Wong, Direct Flyte (Roundwound, 2022)

As sideman – with Mike Stern
 These Times (ESC, 2003)
 Who Let the Cats Out? (Heads Up, 2006)
 All Over the Place (Heads Up, 2012)
 Trip (Heads Up, 2017)

Bibliography
 The Music Lesson: A Spiritual Search for Growth Through Music, Penguin Group, 2008
 The Spirit of Music: The Lesson Continues, Penguin Group, 2021

References

External links

 
 Victor Wooten Center for Music and Nature
 Wooten Woods

1964 births
Living people
People from Mountain Home, Idaho
African-American guitarists
African-American rock musicians
African-American male rappers
American bass guitarists
American jazz bass guitarists
American funk bass guitarists
American male bass guitarists
Béla Fleck and the Flecktones members
Grammy Award winners
Jazz fusion bass guitarists
20th-century American guitarists
21st-century American rappers
American male jazz musicians
SMV (band) members
Chick Corea Elektric Band members
Vital Tech Tones members
Heads Up International artists
Vanguard Records artists
Compass Records artists
Musicians from Idaho